James Byrne (Irish: An Beirneach; 4 January 1946 – 8 November 2008) was an Irish farmer and fiddle playing icon from Donegal.  He has been called one of Ireland's leading fiddle players.

Biography
Byrne was born in Mín na Croise (Meenacross), Gleann Cholm Cille (Glencolmcille) in south west County Donegal, Ireland. He learned his first tune from his father John Byrne at the age of 8.

His style is the old Glencolmcille, County Donegal, style. He was the link between the older generation of musicians in his area - his neighbours, the Dohertys, the Cassidys, the McConnells, to name but a few - and the young generation of Donegal fiddlers today whom he taught and inspired.

By 1980, many of the older local musicians had died, and Donegal music was being played only in isolated pubs. Ironically, it was a time when Irish traditional music was becoming increasingly popular throughout Ireland, Britain and America due to groups such as Planxty and the Bothy Band. Claddagh Records, the Dublin label, recorded The Brass Fiddle: Traditional Fiddle Music From Donegal, featuring Byrne. He followed this with a solo album, The Road to Glenlough (a lake near his home in Mín na Croise), in 1990. A young band from Donegal, Altan, started playing many of his tunes and became popular internationally.

James's reputation increased nationally and internationally when adult students of the Irish language and Irish traditional music discovered him while attending language and music classes at the adult language college Oideas Gael.

He has taught and inspired musicians all over the world and was instrumental in keeping the rich fiddle tradition of Glencolmcille alive. Today, his family - his wife Connie and their three children Merle, Aisling and Seana - and the many young local musicians he taught continue the vibrant tradition.

On many occasions he took part in Ceol sa Ghleann, an arts project hosted in Glencolmcille which includes the annual Féile Ealaíon Traidsiúnta Ghleann Cholm Cille. This is a week-long annual music festival held around Easter time. They also run annual Donegal Fiddle school 'Scoil Samhraidh James Byrne' every July in his memory. https://web.archive.org/web/20081204101816/http://www.ceolsaghleann.com/

He was interviewed by BBC Northern Ireland on an educational programme about the connection between Donegal and Scottish fiddle music. He was also interviewed by Michael Robinson for Fiddler Magazine on The Donegal Fiddle tradition.

In recent years, He began his own summer fiddle school, and performed regularly with his partner, Connie Drost, and their daughters Merle, Aisling and Séana, all excellent fiddlers.

James Byrne died on his way home from a session in the early hours of 8 November 2008 near his home in Mín na Croise His funeral was attended by a host of renowned Irish musicians including All-Ireland singing champion, Rita Gallagher, Dermot Byrne of Altan, the legendary fiddler, Tommy Peoples and Joe Burke.

Discography
 The Brass Fiddle: Traditional Fiddle Music From Donegal Featured: Various fiddlers, including James Byrne, Vincent Campbell, Con Cassidy and Francie Byrne.
 The Road to Glenlough (1990)
 Identification of musical content
 Album review
 'The Beirneach' (2018)
 Identification of musical content

References

External links
James Byrne on County Donegal on the net
Cairdeas na bhFidleiri Donegal Fiddlers Summer School
The South Donegal Fiddle - Programme 2
James Byrne: Carrying on the Donegal Traditions

1946 births
2008 deaths
20th-century violinists
Folk fiddlers
Irish fiddlers
Musicians from County Donegal
Claddagh Records artists